The old Warren Post Office is a Colonial Revival structure at 236 South Main Street in Warren, Arkansas.  The single story brick building was built in 1935–6, and was used by as a post office until 1998.  It was purchased by the city of Warren and repurposed for city offices.  Its exterior remains largely unchanged from the time of its construction, the major alterations being the replacement of the entrance doors and the addition of a handicapped access ramp.

The building was listed on the National Register of Historic Places in 2004.

See also 

National Register of Historic Places listings in Bradley County, Arkansas
List of United States post offices

References 

Post office buildings on the National Register of Historic Places in Arkansas
Colonial Revival architecture in Arkansas
Government buildings completed in 1935
National Register of Historic Places in Bradley County, Arkansas
Individually listed contributing properties to historic districts on the National Register in Arkansas
1935 establishments in Arkansas